
Year 468 BC was a year of the pre-Julian Roman calendar. At the time, it was known as the Year of the Consulship of Barbatus and Priscus (or, less frequently, year 286 Ab urbe condita). The denomination 468 BC for this year has been used since the early medieval period, when the Anno Domini calendar era became the prevalent method in Europe for naming years.

Events 
 By place 

 Greece 
 Sparta faces trouble near home, chiefly from Arcadia with the support of Argos. Argos regains control of Tiryns.

 Roman Republic 
 Antium is captured by Roman forces.

 China 
 Zhou Zhen Ding Wang becomes the twenty-eighth sovereign of the Chinese Zhou Dynasty.

 By topic 

 Literature 
 Sophocles, Greek playwright, defeats Aeschylus for the Athenian Prize.

Births

Deaths 
 Aristides, Athenian statesman (b. 530 BC)

References